Dust Be My Destiny is a 1939 American drama film starring John Garfield as a man who gets into trouble after being sentenced to a work farm.

Plot
Joe Bell (John Garfield) becomes embittered after he is jailed for 16 months for burglary . Later, While riding in a boxcar with two brothers, he gets into a fight with a robber (played by an uncredited Ward Bond) and is sentenced to a work farm for 90 days. There, he becomes friends with Mabel Alden (Priscilla Lane), which displeases Charles Garreth (Stanley Ridges), her stepfather and the farm's foreman. The two men fight, and Joe knocks Garreth out. Panicking, the young couple flee and get married, only to learn that Garreth has died and that Joe is wanted for his murder.

Constantly on the move to avoid capture, Joe finally gets a break. He is in the right spot to take pictures of a bank robbery in progress. He uses them to get a job as a photographer at a newspaper run by Mike Leonard (Alan Hale, Sr.). When the leader of the outfit  tries to get the negatives, Joe saves Mike's life. Unfortunately, his own picture is put on the front page of various newspapers as a result. Joe tries to flee once more, but Mabel turns him in to the police, convinced that running away is the wrong thing to do.

At the trial, despite a parade of character witnesses in Joe's favor, the prosecutor (John Litel) seems to have the upper hand. Defense attorney Slim Jones (Moroni Olsen) calls Mabel to the stand. She convinces the jury to declare her husband innocent.

Cast
 John Garfield as Joe Bell
 Priscilla Lane as Mabel Alden
 Alan Hale, Sr. as Mike Leonard
 Frank McHugh as Caruthers
 Billy Halop as Hank Glenn
 Bobby Jordan as Jimmy Glenn
 Charley Grapewin as Pop
 Henry Armetta as Nick Spelucci
 Stanley Ridges as Charles Garreth
 John Litel as the Prosecutor
 Moroni Olsen as Slim Jones

Reception 
Boxoffice wrote that the film was "an adroitly wrought screenplay provides a welcome mitigation of the theme's austerity through the injection of a vein of comedy and romance without detracting one whit from the strength of the feature, which is entertainment from start to finish and for all ages and classes... John Garfield was never better than in the part of a homeless youngster struggling against almost insurmountable odds for his place in the sun, while his performance is challenged all the way in an equally splendid portrayal by Priscilla Lane... Masterfully directed by Lewis Seiler".

Variety reviewed, "Although story is overlong and episodic, these deficiencies are partially overcome by excellent performances of Garfield and Miss Lane. Garfield has a role particularly tailored to general typing of recent film portrayals, and which will enhance his popularity. Miss Lane is competently sincere throughout, with several dramatic scenes rising far above the material provided... Yarn is slow in generating interest, and rather static in several spots, but there are other dramatic high spots to make it acceptable on the whole".

The Los Angeles Times wrote, "John Garfield and Priscilla Lane, who truly go to town with their acting together, have the leads. Their courtroom scenes are eminently fine, and moving... The picture is not satisfactory at the outset, but reaches an excellent climax".

Mae Tinee of the Chicago Daily Tribune wrote, "In many places it is sincere, workmanlike and credible production. At other times it's just ten, twent' thirt'--and ham. But the leads are so likable and some of the suspense so suspenseful that I think you'll chalk up Dust Be My Destiny as satisfactory entertainment".

Frank S. Nugent of the New York Times reviewed it as the "latest of the [Warner] Brothers' apparently interminable line of melodramas about the fate-dogged boys from the wrong side of the railroad tracks. Considering the practice they have had, it's not at all surprising that the picture goes its way smoothly, never missing a dramatic cue, a pause for laughter, a perfectly timed spurt of action when the utter futility of it all begins to grow too utterly utter If that's the measure of success, the Warners can chalk up another. Personally, we're tired of the formula. It's not even fun, any more, outguessing the script".

References

External links
 
 
 
 

1939 films
1939 drama films
American black-and-white films
American courtroom films
Films directed by Lewis Seiler
Films with screenplays by Robert Rossen
American prison drama films
Warner Bros. films
1930s American films